Haeundae Beach（）is an urban beach in Busan, South Korea, located in the eponymous Haeundae District.

The beach is open year-round.  Various festivals are held there throughout the year, including the Polar Bear Club, held annually in January since 1988, in which participants bathe in near-freezing water. The beach  hosts a number of e-sports events designed to promote Blizzard games including StarCraft.

Haeundae is  associated with cinema, due to the Busan International Film Festival and  the 2009 disaster film Tidal Wave.

References

Beaches of South Korea
Haeundae District
Landforms of Busan
Venues of the 2002 Asian Games